The Arab Socialist Movement's Damascus branch is a Syrian political party that operates from Damascus. It originated as faction of the Arab Socialist Movement, a party which broke apart in the 1960s, and continues to claim the original party's name and legacy. The Damascus branch is headed by Abdul-Ghani Qannout, and joined the Ba'ath Party-led National Progressive Front government in 1972 and has continued to support the al-Assad family's rule in Syria ever since. After Abdul-Ghani Qannout died in 2001, Ahmad al-Ahmad became the new secretary general; under him, the party continued its pro-government course, even during the Syrian Civil War. Amid the conflict's civil uprising phase, the Arab Socialist Movement's Damascus branch organised pro-government rallies. When the uprising escalated into a full insurgency, members of the party organised pro-government militias. Assistant secretary general Omar Adnan al-Alawi headed the National Defence Forces' Deir ez-Zor branch during part of the siege of Deir ez-Zor (2014–17), and was wounded in combat. A member of the party's political office, Turki Albu Hamad, in founding the "Forces of the Fighters of the Tribes" militia.

References

Works cited 

1950 establishments in Syria
Arab nationalism in Syria
Ba'athist parties
Ba'ath Party breakaway groups
Political parties established in 1950
Political parties in Syria
Secularism in Syria
Socialist parties in Syria